Angelo Scuri (born 24 December 1959) is an Italian fencer. He won a gold medal in the team foil event at the 1984 Summer Olympics.

References

External links
 
 

1959 births
Living people
Italian male fencers
Olympic fencers of Italy
Fencers at the 1984 Summer Olympics
Olympic gold medalists for Italy
Olympic medalists in fencing
Sportspeople from Florence
Medalists at the 1984 Summer Olympics
20th-century Italian people
21st-century Italian people